The New York Film Critics Circle Award for Best Foreign Language Film is one of the annual awards given by the New York Film Critics Circle.

Winners

1930s

1940s

1950s

1960s

1970s

1980s

1990s

2000s

2010s

2020s

Multiple winners 
10 directors have won the award multiple times.

See also
 Golden Globe for Best Foreign Language Film
 Independent Spirit Award for Best International Film
 World cinema

References

External links
 

New York Film Critics Circle Awards
Film awards for Best Foreign Language Film